The common wood-nymph (Cercyonis pegala) is a North American butterfly in the family Nymphalidae. It is also known as the wood-nymph, grayling, blue-eyed grayling, and the goggle eye.

Description 

The common wood-nymph can vary greatly. All individuals are brown with two eyespots on each forewing – the lower one often being larger than the upper one. Some may have many, few, or no eyespots on the ventral surface of the hindwing. In the southeastern part of its range, it has a large yellow patch on both surfaces of the forewing. In the western part of its range, it may have a pale yellow patch or may be lacking one. Individuals in the Northeast also lack the yellow patch, i.e., C. p. nephele. In individuals with no yellow patch, there are two pale yellow eye rings that encircle both the forewing eyespots. The wingspan measures 5.3 to 7.3 cm (2.1 to 2.9 in).

These butterflies have ears on their forewings that are most sensitive to low frequency sounds (less than 5 kHz). A conspicuous swelling of their forewing vein are directly connected to the ears

Subspecies 
The following subspecies are recognized:
Cercyonis pegala abbotti (Brown, 1969)
Cercyonis pegala alope (Fabricius, 1793) – Texas
Cercyonis pegala ariane (Boisduval, 1852) – Oregon, Utah
Cercyonis pegala blanca (Emmel & Mattoon, 1972)
Cercyonis pegala boopis (Behr, 1864) – British Columbia
Cercyonis pegala damei (Barnes & Benjamin, 1926)
Cercyonis pegala ino (Hall, 1924) – prairies
Cercyonis pegala nephele (Kirby, 1837) – northern Canada and US
Cercyonis pegala olympus (Edwards, 1880)
Cercyonis pegala pegala (Fabricius, 1775) - eastern US
Cercyonis pegala stephensi (Wright, 1905)
Cercyonis pegala texana (Edwards, 1880) – Texas
Cercyonis pegala wheeleri (Edwards, 1873)

Similar species 
In the western part of the common wood-nymph's range, there are a few similar species. The Great Basin wood-nymph (Cercyonis sthenele) and the small wood-nymph (Cercyonis oetus) are smaller, and the lower forewing eyespot is smaller than the upper one. Mead's wood-nymph (Cercyonis meadii) has a bright red-orange area on the ventral forewing.

Range and distribution 
The common wood-nymph ranges from Nova Scotia and Quebec west to northern British Columbia south to northern California southeast to Texas and east to northern Florida.

Habitat 
The common wood-nymph is found in a variety of open habitats, such as open woodlands, woodland edges, fields, pastures, wet meadows, prairies, salt marshes, and savannas.

Flight period 
The common wood-nymph is found from mid-May to early October in the eastern part of its range. It is found from late June to early July in California and Arizona. It has one brood per year throughout its entire range.

Adult food sources 
The common wood-nymph feeds on nectar, tree sap, and decaying matters. Some of the plants it nectars on include:

 Asclepias tuberosa – butterfly weed
 Cirsium arvense – Canada thistle
 Cirsium vulgare – bull thistle
 Daucus carota – wild carrot
 Dipsacus sylvestris - teasel
 Monarda fistulosa – wild bergamot
 Pycnanthemum virginianum – Virginia mountain mint
 Rudbeckia hirta – black-eyed susan
 Trifolium pratense – red clover
 Vernonia gigantea – tall ironweed

Life cycle 

The female common wood-nymph is the active flight partner. The female lays her eggs on or near the host plant. The egg is pale yellow, later turning to a tan color with orange or pink blotches. The caterpillar makes no shelters or nests. It is green or yellowish green with darker green stripes that run the length of the body. It has two short pinkish projections on the end of the abdomen. It has yellow spiracles and is covered in thin, white hairs. The caterpillar will reach a length of 5 cm (2 in). The common wood-nymph caterpillar is very similar to satyr caterpillars in the genera Hermeuptychia, Cyllopsis, and Neonympha. It can be separated by its larger size and habitat. The pale green chrysalis is striped in white or pale yellow. The first instar caterpillar hibernates.

Host plants 
Here is a list of host plants used by the common wood-nymph:

 Andropogon sp. – beard grasses
 Danthonia spicata – poverty oatgrass
 Poa pratensis – Kentucky bluegrass
 Schizachyrium sp. – bluestems
 Tridens flavus – purple top

Image gallery

References

External links 

 
 

Cercyonis
Butterflies of North America
Butterflies described in 1775